KTT can mean:

MTR KTT, train set of the Hong Kong MTR Corporation
KTT Velocette racing motorcycle (1929-1949)
Kittilä Airport, Finland, IATA code